Cream is an unincorporated community located in the town of Lincoln, in Buffalo County, Wisconsin.

References

Unincorporated communities in Buffalo County, Wisconsin
Unincorporated communities in Wisconsin